Bazin (also Romanized as Bazīn, Bezīn, and Bozīn; also known as Barīn, Bīzīn, and Bīzīū) is a village in Bizineh Rud Rural District, Bizineh Rud District, Khodabandeh County, Zanjan Province, Iran. At the 2006 census, its population was 1,754, in 433 families.

References 

Populated places in Khodabandeh County